The 2011-12 Belgian First Division season in women's football was the final season of the Belgian Women's First Division. The league involved 14 clubs, with two teams promoted from the Second Division: K. Achterbroek VV and KSK Heist.

Standard Fémina de Liège, the defending champion, won the league's final title.

The national federations of Belgium and the Netherlands folded their top women's divisions into the binational BeNe League; after receiving UEFA approval, the new league played its first season in 2012–13.

Teams

Standings

References

Bel
Belgian Women's First Division
Wom